The women's 4 × 400 metres relay event at the 2019 European Athletics Indoor Championships was held on 3 March 2019 at 20:40 (final) local time.

Records

Results

References

2019 European Athletics Indoor Championships
4 × 400 metres relay at the European Athletics Indoor Championships